South Carolina Highway 16 may refer to:

South Carolina Highway 16, a current state highway mostly within Columbia
South Carolina Highway 16 (1920s), a former state highway from Columbia to northeast of Bowling Green
South Carolina Highway 16 (1940s), a former state highway completely within Columbia

016 (disambiguation)
Transportation in Columbia, South Carolina